Tone King is a manufacturer of vacuum tube guitar amplifiers and stand-alone attenuators located in Baltimore, Maryland, U.S. Tone King was founded by Mark Bartel in 1993 in Kingston, New York. In 1994 Mark moved the company to Baltimore.
Tone King is one of the boutique "vintage" amplifier companies making Fender style amps. Tone King was owned by the company Premier Builders Guild (PBG). In 2016 PBG went out of business and sold the Tone King brand to Boutique Amps Distribution (BAD), which now manufacturers these amps in Huntington Park, California.

In January 2016, Tone King introduced the new Royalist 45 Mk II amplifier, an updated version of Tone King's Royalist amplifier, known for its low-gain British sound qualities. That same month, Tone King introduced an updated version of its Ironman attenuator, the Ironman II Mini.

There are 4 different amplifiers in the current lineup that all feature the Ironman compensated reactive load attenuation: Gremlin Combo, Falcon Grande Combo, Imperial Head and Combo, Sky King.

Critical Acclaim
Of the Tone King Ironman II Mini attenuator, Guitar Player magazine reviewer Dave Hunter said this in a June 28, 2016 review: "The Ironman II Mini will go down to whisper-quiet, and sound reasonably good in the process, but the better test was in knocking off a reasonable 6dB to 9dB, at which levels I found it impressively accurate and unobtrusive."

References

External links
Official website
Guitar Player review
Harmony Central reviews
Kenn Fox interview Describes using a Tone King amp.
Guitarist James Bay references his use of Tone King amplifiers. 

Guitar amplifier manufacturers
Audio equipment manufacturers of the United States